Kanata South Ward or Ward 23 (French: Quartier Kanata-Sud) is a municipal ward in Ottawa, Ontario. Located in the city's west end, the ward created in 2006 includes the communities of Katimavik-Hazeldean, Glen Cairn, Bridlewood, and Trailwest. During a ward re-organization in 2006, the former Kanata Ward was split into two wards, Kanata North for areas north of Highway 417 and Kanata South for areas to the south.

City councillors
Peggy Feltmate (2006-2010)
Allan Hubley (2010–present)

Election results

2006 Ottawa municipal election

2010 Ottawa municipal election

2014 Ottawa municipal election

2018 Ottawa municipal election

2022 Ottawa municipal election

References

External links
 Map of Kanata South Ward

Ottawa wards